Ohoopee is an unincorporated community and census-designated place (CDP) in Toombs County, in the U.S. state of Georgia.

It first appeared as a CDP in the 2020 Census with a population of 29.

History
A post office called Ohoopee was established in 1875, and remained in operation until 1953. The community took its name from the nearby Ohoopee River.

The Georgia General Assembly incorporated Ohoopee as a town in 1907. The town's municipal charter was repealed in 1995.

Demographics

2020 census

Note: the US Census treats Hispanic/Latino as an ethnic category. This table excludes Latinos from the racial categories and assigns them to a separate category. Hispanics/Latinos can be of any race.

References

Former municipalities in Georgia (U.S. state)
Unincorporated communities in Toombs County, Georgia
Census-designated places in Toombs County, Georgia
Populated places disestablished in 1995